José Eduardo Cavalcanti de Mendonça, known as Duda Mendonça (10 August 1944 – 16 August 2021), was a Brazilian advertising person and political strategist. Owner of a publicity agency called Duda Propaganda, he became known for his political campaigns, managing more than 55 national campaigns, including mayoral, senatorial, gubernatorial and presidential races in more than 20 years of experience.

His work in the 2002 presidential campaign for Luiz Inácio Lula da Silva was widely praised by professionals for its effectiveness. Duda is known as "the man who elected Lula", as it was the fourth time in a row that Lula was seeking to be elected to the highest office position in the country. He also worked on the campaigns of Paulo Maluf, Miguel Arraes, and Ciro Gomes in Brazil, and of the Portuguese Prime Minister Pedro Passos Coelho.

In October 2004, he was arrested at an illegal cock fighting arena in the State of Rio de Janeiro.

Personal life 
Mendonça was born in Salvador and died on 16 August 2021 in São Paulo at the age of 77.

References

1944 births
2021 deaths
20th-century Brazilian businesspeople
People from Salvador, Bahia
21st-century Brazilian businesspeople